Simba: The King of the Beasts is a 1928 American black-and-white silent documentary film, directed by Martin and Osa Johnson, which features the couple's four-year expedition to track the lion across Kenyan veld to his lair.

Production
Footage for the film was shot from 1924 to 1927, during the couple's second and longest trip to Africa, when they spent much of their time in northern Kenya by a lake they dubbed Paradise, at Mount Marsabit. The film Martin's Safari (1928) was also made with footage of this trip and some was reused in later productions Congorilla (1932) and Osa's Four Years in Paradise (1941).

Reviews
Allmovie reviewer Hal Erickson writes that, despite being made, "under the auspices of the American Museum of Natural History," and purporting, "to be an authentic filmed record of the Johnsons' most recent foray into Africa," the "expedition" documentary, "seldom lets facts get in the way of a good story." For example, "The film's highlight shows the intrepid Mrs. Osa Johnson bringing down a charging rhinoceros with one well-aimed shot. But the reusage of Simba footage in the Johnsons' 1932 documentary Congorilla reveals that the rhino was merely scared away by the gunfire — a classic example of how the truth can be 'adjusted with the help of a clever editor.'"

The "groundbreaking travelogue," was, according to WildFilmHistory, "Filmed in an era when African wildlife was still relatively bountiful, the production shows how the landscape looked in the early twentieth century." "Evading stampeding elephants, employing scores of servants and gamefully shooting down a variety of species," "with the production including provoked behaviour, staged confrontations and animals shot to death on film. Relying heavily on cutting in kills from professional marksmen, numerous hunting scenes culminate in a heart stopping sequence where, with the use of clever editing, the adventurous Mrs Johnson appears to bring down a charging rhinoceros with one well-aimed shot," and "the film provides an intriguing glimpse not only into 1920s Africa but also into the Johnsons themselves, part of a 'gung-ho' breed that is, in itself, now largely extinct." "Responsible for introducing a whole generation of American movie-goers to the wonders of the African environment, Simba was a large-scale success, detailing wildlife and indigenous tribespeople that had seldom appeared on screen before."

References

External links

1928 films
1928 documentary films
Black-and-white documentary films
American black-and-white films
Films about lions
Films set in Africa
American silent feature films
American documentary films
1920s American films